Paradwys is a village in Anglesey, in north-west Wales.

References

Villages in Anglesey
Llangristiolus